Guardrail Ridge is a ridge  long located 2 nautical miles west-southwest of The Tooth in the Kyle Hills of Ross Island, Antarctica. The name, given by the Advisory Committee on Antarctic Names in 2000, alludes to the position of the ridge along the southern margin of Lofty Promenade.

References

Ridges of Ross Island